The Zero S is an electric motorcycle made by Zero Motorcycles.

On 23 April 2009 the company announced it would establish a distribution network in the Canadian market while getting regulatory approval for selling the motorcycle in Canada. It expects to start selling in Canada by early July 2009.

The battery can be recharged using standard 120V or 240V plugs.

Zero made minor changes and small battery improvements to the 2014 Zero S, and added ABS brakes to the 2015 model, and further battery improvements in 2016.

References

External links

Zero S specifications
2009 Zero S Test Ride: Electric Street Bike Hits 60 MPH and 60 Miles Per Charge
Zero Motorcycles Becomes First American Motorcycle Company to Bring High Performance Electric Street Motorcycle to Market
Neal Saiki of Zero Motorcycles describes Zero X and Zero S design at Google
2013 Zero S Motorcycle Review

S
Motorcycles introduced in 2009
Electric motorcycles